The Monnett Monex is a single seat, all-aluminium, Volkswagen powered, homebuilt racer.

Design and development
The Monex shares the same aluminium construction and basic fuselage shape as the Monnett Moni and the later Sonex Aircraft Sonex series of aircraft.

Operational history
1982 - Lowers-Baker-Falk 500 Race - 3rd place (efficiency), 5th place (speed)
1982 - World Speed Record FAI's Class C-1a/0 185.12 mph (297,86 km/h) over 100 km
1982 - World Speed Record FAI's Class C-1a/0 182.308 mph (298,16 km/h) over 500 km

Specifications (Monnett Monex)

References

1980s United States sport aircraft
Homebuilt aircraft
Monnett aircraft
Low-wing aircraft
Single-engined tractor aircraft
V-tail aircraft
Aircraft first flown in 1980